Mitta Mitta is a small town in the Australian state of Victoria in the Mitta Mitta Valley. It stands on the Omeo Highway and is 415 km from Melbourne (and the same distance from Canberra), and is located on the Mitta Mitta River not far from Dartmouth Dam. At the 2016 census, Mitta Mitta and the surrounding area had a population of 171.

Etymology
The name "Mitta Mitta" derives from the name local Aboriginal people gave to the Mitta Mitta River – "mida-modunga" (where reeds grow, modunga being a particular type of reed).

Geography
Mitta Mitta is situated at the southernmost end of the intermontane Mitta Mitta Valley on the foothills of the Great Dividing Range. At the airport, Mitta Mitta is 250 m (820 ft) above mean sea level. The town is at the confluence of the Mitta Mitta River and Snowy Creek, 18 km from Mount Bogong, the highest mountain in Victoria. The hamlet sits between Mt Welcome (883m) and Mt Misery (363m).  Mitta Mitta is on the Omeo Highway, a major transportation connection between Northern Victoria and Gippsland. Prior to the completion of the Dartmouth Dam in 1979, the valley was subjected to frequent flooding.
The floral emblem of Mitta Mitta is the Mitta Wattle (acacia dawsonii), also known as the poverty wattle and is to be found close to the town on the Omeo Highway and Dartmouth Road.

Education
Mitta Mitta Primary School (no 887) was opened on 1 October 1869. It is a small school that has been threatened with closure a number of times. Children rode horses to the school until the 1980s.
Secondary children are bussed to Tallangatta, a 140 km daily round trip.

Brief history
The Mitta Mitta Valley was settled by early pastoralists in 1835 and Mitta Mitta became a settlement when gold was discovered there in 1852.
Substantial hydraulic sluicing replaced alluvial mining, the Pioneer Mine being the most successful, yielding over 441 kg of gold until it closed in 1904. This large open-cut mine still forms the backdrop to the town. Aboriginals used the River as a food source, social connections and sometimes wars. Their presence goes back at least 4,000 years and artifacts are frequently found along the River and creeks. The principle tribe in the district was the Jaitmatang (also spelt yaithmathang) with the theddora-mittung occupying the area around the southern end of the Valley near present Mitta Mitta. Their spoken language was Dhudhoroa Language, no longer spoken but being revived in some locals primary schools.

Economy
Mining, cropping and cattle provided income until the Federation Drought. Dairy farming was a major pursuit until around 2000 and since then, beef cattle production has since become the principal activity with the Mitta Valley offering some the finest and productive country in the State. Some niche agri-business enterprises are appearing, namely the production of hazelnuts and mushrooms. The town was seriously compromised during the 2003 bushfires and was shut down in 2020 during the January bushfires and subsequent COVID-19 lockdown until early 2022.
Mitta is fast developing into a tourist mecca that provides an opportunity for economic and population growth to offset some of the pressures from a falling permanent population and a decline in local dairy production. A mountain bike precinct is being developed that will further accelerate the town's importance as a visitor destination, although there are concerns that the infrastructure (especially a portable water supply and sewerage) is insufficient to sustain this development.
Houses within the township are more frequently being acquired as 'weekenders', indicating the desirability of Mitta Mitta as a beautiful and peaceful retreat.

Population
There are around 45 full-time residents in the hamlet.
The 2016 Census provides the following data for Mitta and environs (including farming communities, pop 171):
    Median age was 52 years
    48% are married,  35% never married
    22% have bachelor's degree Level and above
    67% born in Australia
    30% no religion, 23% Catholic, 13% Anglican
    83% with internet access from home

Climate
Mitta Mitta has a borderline oceanic/humid subtropical climate (Köppen Cfb Cfa) with hot summers and cool winters, and a high diurnal range throughout the year.  Average rainfall is 1043mm (1910-2022) 
with July and August the wettest months.
Actual Weather report (Mitta Airport).

Governance
In local government, the Mitta Valley is covered by the Shire of Towong with the local seat of government at Tallangatta.
In state politics, Mitta Mitta is located in the Legislative Assembly district of Benambra.
In federal politics, Mitta Mitta is located in a single House of Representatives division—the Division of Indi.

Transportation & Communications
Mitta Mitta Airport (privately owned) provides access to the town for Air Ambulance, flight training, fire fighting, agriculture services and visitors. A daily freight service operates between Albury/Wodonga and Mitta Mitta.  A community-funded television translator situated on Mt Sugarloaf relays free-to-air programs from Albury. Telstra provides 4G mobile phone coverage to the town and a CB repeater on Channel 1 offers a safety and emergency service.

Community

The Mitta Valley has a strong culture of volunteerism with the 2021 Census indicating that 35% of the population volunteer through an organisation.
The town operates a Country Fire Authority (CFA) branch together with a local State Emergency Service (SES) branch.  Locally trained Ambulance Community Officers (ACOs) service an area of 2500 km2 on a 24/7 basis on behalf of Ambulance Victoria. There is a Victoria Police Station in the centre of the town.

The major annual event is the Mighty Mitta Muster held on the long weekend in March and is conducted by local volunteers.

The town in conjunction with neighbouring township Eskdale has an Australian Rules football team "Mitta United" competing in the Tallangatta & District Football League.

Golfers play at the course of the Mitta Mitta Golf Club on Magorra Park.

The Mitta Mitta Brewing Co produces craft beers.

There is one pub in the centre of town, the Mitta Pub (formerly the Laurel Hotel). The pub sits next to Paddy's Reserve and backs on to Snowy Creek.

See also 
 List of reduplicated Australian place names

References

External links
 Mitta Mitta Homepage & Tourist Information

Mining towns in Victoria (Australia)
Towns in Victoria (Australia)
Shire of Towong